Events from the year 1920 in Russia

Events

Births

 January 14 – Vahe Danielyan, Soviet soldier and concentration camp survivor 
 July 11 
 Yul Brynner, Russian-born actor, singer, and director
 Zecharia Sitchin, Soviet-born American author
 November 29 – Yegor Ligachyov, politician 
 December 6 – Nikolai Kirtok, World War II fighter pilot

Deaths

9 March - Lidija Figner, revolutionary and a prominent member of the Narodniks  (born 1853)

References

 
Years of the 20th century in Russia